The Raid on Pula (Italian: Impresa di Pola) was a maritime raid undertaken on 1 November 1918 at the end of World War I. It was carried out with a manned torpedo by two officers of the Italian Regia Marina, Raffaele Paolucci and Raffaele Rossetti, with the goal of damaging what they thought was an Austro-Hungarian fleet anchored in the bay of Pula.

The fleet was handed by the Austrians to the newly established State of Slovenes, Croats and Serbs only a couple of hours before the raid, with Janko Vuković, previously an officer of the Austro-Hungarian navy, being declared the commander-in-chief of the new state's navy. The state of Slovenes, Croats and Serbs had declared neutrality in the war and informed the Allies of this shortly after taking over the armed forces on 31 October. However, the attackers were not aware of this, and rigged the main ship SMS Viribus Unitis (renamed to Jugoslavija) with explosives, which ended in the ship sinking and the death of Vuković.

The Sinking
Travelling down the rows of Austrian battleships, Paolucci and Rossetti encountered the Viribus Unitis at around 4:40 am. Rossetti placed one canister of TNT on the hull of the battleship, timed to explode at 6:30 am. He then flooded the second canister, sinking it on the harbour floor close to the ship. The men had no breathing sets, and therefore had to keep their heads above water. They were discovered and taken prisoner just after placing the explosives under the battleship's hull. Taken aboard the Viribus Unitis, they informed the new captain of the battleship of what they had done but did not reveal the exact position of the explosives. Admiral Janko Vuković arranged for the two prisoners to be taken to Tegetthoff, and ordered the Viribus Unitis to be evacuated.

The explosion did not happen at 6:30 as predicted and Vuković returned to the ship with many sailors, mistakenly believing that the Italians had lied. The mines exploded at 6:44, sinking the battleship in 15 minutes. Vuković and 300–400 of her crew were killed in the sinking. The explosion of the second canister also sank the Austrian freighter Wien.

Remnants of sunken naval ships from the Raid on Pula have left over 3000 tonnes of steel at the bottom of Pula Port. The Pula Port seabed is now littered with thousands of parts from Austro-Hungarian ships from the Uljanik Shipyard. Today, debris is still preventing cruise ships from safely docking at the ports.

References

Conflicts in 1918
History of Istria
Pula
History of the Adriatic Sea
November 1918 events